Waingaro  is a rural community in the Waikato District and Waikato region of New Zealand's North Island, on the banks of the Waingaro River, where it is fed by a hot spring.

Demographics
The SA1 area is part of the larger Te Ākau statistical area.

Waingaro had a population of 180 at the 2018 New Zealand census, an increase of 33 people (22.4%) since the 2013 census, and an increase of 6 people (3.4%) since the 2006 census. There were 63 households, comprising 99 males and 81 females, giving a sex ratio of 1.22 males per female. The median age was 47.3 years (compared with 37.4 years nationally), with 21 people (11.7%) aged under 15 years, 30 (16.7%) aged 15 to 29, 99 (55.0%) aged 30 to 64, and 33 (18.3%) aged 65 or older.

Ethnicities were 71.7% European/Pākehā, and 45.0% Māori. People may identify with more than one ethnicity.

Although some people chose not to answer the census's question about religious affiliation, 51.7% had no religion, 33.3% were Christian, 1.7% had Māori religious beliefs and 1.7% had other religions.

Of those at least 15 years old, 21 (13.2%) people had a bachelor's or higher degree, and 48 (30.2%) people had no formal qualifications. The median income was $19,600, compared with $31,800 nationally. 18 people (11.3%) earned over $70,000 compared to 17.2% nationally. The employment status of those at least 15 was that 69 (43.4%) people were employed full-time, 33 (20.8%) were part-time, and 12 (7.5%) were unemployed.

Marae

Waingaro Paa (Marae) is the meeting place of the local Waikato Tainui hapū of [Ngaati Tamainupoo, Ngaati Te Huaki and Ngaati Toa Kotara]]. It includes Ngaa Tokotoru the meeting house.  The naming of the wharenui reflects the three Haapu and the Tuupuna that bear their names. 

In October 2020, the Government committed $2,584,751 from the Provincial Growth Fund to upgrade the marae and 7 other Waikato Tainui marae, creating 40 jobs.

Education

Waingaro Hot Spring 
Waingaro Hot Spring was closed in 2014, until improvements were made and it reopened in 2016.

In 1921 this description was given:Waingaro/ on the coach-road from Ngaruawhahia to the west coast, has waters of the most strictly simple 'thermal' type, containing only 22 grains of solids to the gallon. It is not a 'spa,' though it is used locally and had at one time a great reputation among the Maoris. The outflow of water is very large and the temperature high. There is a large simple immersion bath, with hotel accommodation alongside.

ANALYSIS   Grains per gallon.

 Sodium chloride 6-43
 Silica 7-80
 Total solids 22-66
 Temperature. 130 °F.In 1942 a corrugated iron shelter, which had covered the spring on the north side of the road, was swept away by a flood. After that the hot water was piped under the road and the present complex of baths built.

Waingaro Landing 

The narrow,  gravel road from Ohautira Rd to the boat ramp and whitebait stands at Waingaro Landing now sees little traffic, but was once much more important.

Just south of the point where the Waingaro joins the Kerikeri River, there is a record of Waingaro Landing being used by Rev A N Brown in 1834 to travel from Bay of Islands to Kawhia. Little changed for another half century.

Most of it was in heavy bush. Clarke had started clearing it, employing Arthur Moon and Johnnie Douglas. Picken travelled to Huntly by train, crossing the Waikato by boat, then rode on a bridle track to Glen Afton and finally on a native track through heavy bush of rimu and matai on the hills, and kahikatea on the flats. Within a year the native track had been turned into a bridle track. Picken was joined by George Richards, Arthur Shilson, Ned Edmonds, Stevens, Arthur Richards and Pyne. The Crown then built a road from Ngāruawāhia to the landing. By 1893 most land had been bought, except   at the Hot Springs  on a 21-year lease to Sam Wilson, who built the hotel.

Charles Sutton bought the  steam launch 'Vesta', which could tow a punt from Raglan to Waingaro in one hour. An experiment with the  'Amateur' was unsuccessful; it took 3 hours. In 1896 the 'Vesta' was repaired and took on the work again.

For almost two decades the landing became a popular route to Raglan, when Captain Coge ran the S.S. 'Maori' between Raglan and the landing from 1903. A coach from Ngāruawāhia brought mail and passengers.

About 1903, the Ministry of Tourist and Health Resorts published these options for journeys from Auckland to Raglan:

 Auckland to Ngāruawāhia, : Depart rail Auckland 10 a.m.
 Arrive Ngāruawāhia, 12.58 p.m. 1st class 8/10, 2nd 5/9.
 Ngāruawāhia to Waingaro, . Coach departs Tuesday and Friday, 1.15 p.m. arrives 4 p.m. 6/- single, 10/- return.
 Waingaro to Raglan, . Oil launch Tuesday and Friday. 2/6 single, 4/- return.
 Raglan to Onehunga . N.S.S. (Northern Steamship) Steamer weekly. 20/- single, 30/- return. Saloon.
 Onehunga to Auckland, . Rail frequently. First I/-, 2nd 9 pence.
 Raglan to Hamilton, . Coach M.W. and Fridays. Departs 7 a.m. Arrives 1.10 p.m.
 Hamilton to Raglan. Coach Tues., Thurs., and Saturdays. Depart Hamilton 9 a.m. Arrives 4 p.m. Single 12/-, return 20/-.

Coge soon gave up the boat service, but by 18 November 1904 the Raglan Chronicle was advertising for cargo for the launch 'Nita' after 7 local men formed the co-operative, Raglan Launch Co, to take over, with land agent, A. R. Langley, as secretary. With Mr B. Vercoe in charge, she continued trading until a fire in March, 1909, with Frank Charlton in charge. However, the fire seems to have been extinguished and the 'Nita' was later bought by Billy McQueen, who traded round the harbour till about 1920. From time to time the Post Office invited tenders to carry mail on the route. The County Council agreed to extend the shed and wharf in 1910, though not buy extra land for it. The work was completed in 1913.

The road to the landing was still being improved in 1905, when £100 was allocated.

After 1920 the mail coach was replaced by a cream truck run by Bob Gibb on a Ngāruawāhia-Te Ākau mail run.

References

External links 

 1955 Waingaro Landing aerial photo - the foreground shows part of the Kerikeri River arm of the harbour, which is over 3 km long. The Waingaro River joins the estuary in the middle left of the photo.
 Photo of oil launch 'Nita'.
 New Zealand Herald 17 June 1893 - description of hot springs and their history.

Waikato District
Populated places in Waikato
Hot springs of New Zealand